Laeta Umbreya is an Indian politician. He was elected to the Lok Sabha, the lower house of the Parliament of India from the Arunachal East constituency of Arunachal Pradesh  as a member of the Indian National Congress.

References

External links
 Official Biographical Sketch in Lok Sabha Website

1955 births
Indian National Congress politicians
Lok Sabha members from Arunachal Pradesh
India MPs 1989–1991
India MPs 1991–1996
Living people